Malek Hosseini (born 1968) is an Iranian philosopher and professor of philosophy at the Iranian Research Institute of Philosophy (until 2021 at the Islamic Azad University, Science and Research Branch, Tehran). He is known for his expertise on Ludwig Wittgenstein's thought and his Persian translations of Wittgenstein's works (including Tractatus Logico-Philosophicus, The Blue Book, Philosophical Investigations, On Certainty, Zettel). Hosseini is a recipient of Iran's Book of the Season Award for his book Wittgenstein und Weisheit.

Books
 Wittgenstein und Weisheit, Kohlhammer Verlag, Stuttgart 2007.

References

External links

21st-century Iranian philosophers
Philosophy academics
Living people
1968 births
Wittgensteinian philosophers
Ludwig Maximilian University of Munich alumni
University of Tehran alumni
Faculty of Letters and Humanities of the University of Tehran alumni